Diego Arbelo Garcia (born 19 August 1994) is an Uruguay rugby union player who generally plays as a prop represents Uruguay internationally. He was included in the Uruguayan squad for the 2019 Rugby World Cup which is held in Japan for the first time and also marks his first World Cup appearance.

Career 
He made his international debut for Uruguay against Paraguay on 30 April 2016.

References

External links

1994 births
Living people
Uruguayan rugby union players
Uruguay international rugby union players
Rugby union props
Rugby union players from Montevideo
Peñarol Rugby players